Schizotorenia is a genus of flowering plants belonging to the family Linderniaceae.

Its native range is Indo-China to Peninsula Malaysia.

Species:

Schizotorenia atropurpurea 
Schizotorenia finetiana

References

Linderniaceae
Lamiales genera